"Battle Is the Lord's" is a song performed by Australian Christian pop singer Rebecca St. James featuring American contemporary worship musician Brandon Lake. The song was released on 12 June 2020, as the lead single to her fifth extended play, Dawn (2020). It later appeared on her tenth studio album, Kingdom Come. St. James co-wrote the song with Heath Balltzglier, Seth Condrey, and Tedd Tjornhom. Seth Mosley collaborated with Tedd Tjornhom in the production of the single.

Background
On 10 June 2020, Heritage Music Group announced that Rebecca St. James would be releasing her first single in nine years, titled "Battle Is the Lord's," on 12 June 2020. St. James shared the story behind the song, saying:

Composition
"Battle Is the Lord's" is composed in the key of G major with a tempo of 160 beats per minute.

Commercial performance
"Battle Is the Lord's" debuted on the Christian Airplay chart dated 27 June 2020, at No. 45. The song went on to peak at No. 34 and had spent fifteen non-consecutive weeks on the chart.

"Battle Is the Lord's" debuted at No. 48 on the US Hot Christian Songs chart dated 8 August 2020.

Music videos
The official lyric video for the "Battle Is the Lord's" was availed by Rebecca St. James on 15 June 2020, to YouTube. The acoustic performance video of the song was published on St. James' YouTube channel on 1 July 2020. On 24 July 2020, St. James uploaded the audio video of the song on YouTube.

Track listing

Charts

Release history

References

External links
 

2020 songs
2020 singles
Contemporary Christian songs
Rebecca St. James songs
Brandon Lake songs
Songs written by Tedd T
Songs written by Rebecca St. James